The 2008 Speed World Challenge season was the 19th Speed World Challenge season. It began March 14, 2008, and finished on October 4, 2008, after 13 rounds.  The defending champions were Jeff Altenburg in Touring Car and Randy Pobst in Grand Touring competition.

Schedule

Schedule is subject to change.

Race results

References

External links
The SPEED World Challenge's official website
Roster

Speed World Challenge
2008 Speed World Challenge